Bijendra Prasad Yadav is an Indian politician, a member of Janata Dal (United). Currently, he is a member of the Bihar Legislative Assembly, as well as the state's Cabinet Minister for Energy, Planning, and Development under Chief Minister Nitish Kumar. He has been an incumbent representative for Supaul since 1990.

References

Janata Dal politicians
Janata Dal (United) politicians
People from Supaul district
State cabinet ministers of Bihar
Bihar MLAs 2020–2025
Living people
1946 births